China Resources Building is a 48-floor office building located at 26 Harbour Road in Wan Chai North, Hong Kong. It was built in 1983.

Tenants
 China Resources Enterprise
 Consulate of North Korea

See also
 Great Eagle Centre
 China Resources Enterprise

External links

  - Alternate URL

Buildings and structures in Hong Kong
Wan Chai